John Harold "J.H." Bruce Lockhart (4 March 1889 – 4 June 1956) was a Scottish cricketer and schoolmaster of the Bruce Lockhart family. His son Logie played rugby union for Scotland, while his brother Robert was a footballer. He was also the grandfather of Lord Bruce-Lockhart and great-grandfather of actor Dugald Bruce Lockhart.

Early life
Lockhart was born in Beith, North Ayrshire on 4 March 1889, the son of Robert Bruce Lockhart, headmaster of Spier's School, Beith, since 1888, by his marriage to Florence Stuart Macgregor.

Beginning his education at Spier's School, Lockhart was introduced to rugby union football and cricket. In 1895 his father, Robert Lockhart, moved on from Spier's School to Seafield House at Broughty Ferry, a new school he founded. Later, Lockhart became headmaster of Eagle House School near Sandhurst, and J. H. B. Lockhart was sent to Sedbergh School, where he was Head of School House, Captain of Football, and Captain of Cricket. After Sedbergh, he went on to Jesus College, Cambridge, where he read Modern Languages. At Cambridge, he was a double Blue, for rugby football and cricket.

Sportsman
Lockhart appeared twice for Scotland at first-class cricket level, against Ireland in 1910 and an All India side in 1911. In the match against Ireland he took eleven wickets, including six for 76 in the second innings. The rest of his first class games were played with Cambridge University, for whom he took over one hundred wickets. He was an international rugby footballer, representing Scotland as a fly half.

Career
Lockhart became an assistant master at Rugby School in 1912. During the First World War, he served in France in the Intelligence Corps with the British Expeditionary Force and was mentioned in despatches. After the war, he returned to his teaching career at Rugby and became a housemaster there in 1923. In 1930 he was appointed as Headmaster of Cargilfield Preparatory School, and in 1937 moved on to become head of his old school, Sedbergh, where he remained until he retired in 1954.

Personal life
In 1913, J.H. Bruce Lockhart married (Alwine) Mona, the daughter of Henry Brougham, formerly a schoolmaster at Wellington College, and they had four sons. These were the headmaster and intelligence officer J. M. Bruce Lockhart (1914–1995), the obstetrician Patrick Bruce Lockhart (1918–2009), and the headmasters and Scottish international rugby union players Rab (1916–1990) and Logie Bruce Lockhart (1921–2020).

John Bruce Lockhart was an accomplished amateur artist, a member of the Lake Artists Society who exhibited at the Royal Academy, the Royal Society of Arts, and the Royal Scottish Society of Painters in Watercolour. He became a member of the Scottish Committee of the Arts Council and was a governor of Welbeck College, a member of the Council of the National Youth Orchestra of Scotland, and a Chevalier of the Légion d'honneur.

See also
 List of Scottish cricket and rugby union players

References

External links
Cricket Europe
Player profile on scrum.com

1889 births
1956 deaths
Military personnel from North Ayrshire
British Army personnel of World War I
Intelligence Corps soldiers
Alumni of Jesus College, Cambridge
Berkshire cricketers
John
Cambridge University cricketers
Chevaliers of the Légion d'honneur
Headmasters of Sedbergh School
Oxford and Cambridge Universities cricketers
People educated at Eagle House School
People educated at Sedbergh School
Rugby union players from Beith
Scotland international rugby union players
Scottish cricketers
Scottish educational theorists
Scottish rugby union players
Scottish schoolteachers